Pentila hewitsoni, the Hewitson's cream pentila, is a butterfly in the family Lycaenidae. It is found in Guinea, Liberia, Ivory Coast, Ghana, Nigeria, Cameroon, Gabon and the Democratic Republic of the Congo. The habitat consists of deep forests.

Adults are attracted to Marantochloa tendrils, feeding from extrafloral nectaries.

Subspecies
Pentila hewitsoni hewitsoni (Guinea, Liberia, Ivory Coast, Ghana, southern Nigeria)
Pentila hewitsoni limbata (Holland, 1893)  (Nigeria: Cross River loop, Cameroon, Gabon, Democratic Republic of the Congo: Mongala)

References

Butterflies described in 1887
Poritiinae
Taxa named by Henley Grose-Smith
Taxa named by William Forsell Kirby
Butterflies of Africa